Vesterøya (West Island) is one of two peninsulas outside Sandefjord, Norway. It is primarily known for its many beaches and idyllic coastal landscape, but there are also numerous trails used for hiking and biking. During the Viking Age, ocean water levels were 3–4 meters higher than today. Vesterøya was, therefore, an island surrounded by waters, but became a peninsula as water levels decreased. Vesterøya was previously known as Velløy, which derives from Vadill-øy.

West Island lies between the Sandefjordsfjord and Mefjord, southeast of the city center. The landscape is dominated by hills, mountains, forests, beaches, sloping rocks, and farm fields. The peninsula has a length of 10 kilometers. It is home to a large number of vacation homes, beaches, campgrounds, and recreational areas. Seawater levels were 20–25 meters higher 5,000 years ago, which means Vesterøya consisted of a large island and 25-30 minor islets. Previous names for Vesterøya include Velløy, Vælløy, Valløy, Veløyene, and Vælløynni.

There are 25 km (15 mi.) of hiking trails at Vesterøya, which is an extension of the 20 km (12 mi.) coastal path at Østerøya (East Island). Combined the 45 km (28 mi.) hiking trail is part of the international North Sea Trail.

Folehavna Fort

Folehavna Fort at West Island's southernmost point was constructed by the Germans in 1941 during the German occupation of Norway. The surrounding area came under German control on May 8, 1941, and the fortifications were raised the same month. By the end of the war, the fort was equipped with four Belgian cannons and several anti-aircraft cannons. The fort was in use by German occupation forces until January 1943. It was home to numerous tunnels, including the longest which was 120 meters (394 ft.). It was also equipped with bunkers, trenches, fencing, barracks, floodlights, battlements, and minefields.

The Norwegian Armed Forces maintained control of the area until 1995 when it became a public recreation area. Bunkers, trenches, barracks, and tunnels can still be seen at Folehavna. At most about 200 German troops were stationed at Folehavna Fort. It is the southernmost point of Sandefjord which is located on the mainland (not including islands).

German forces constructed three large tunnels at Folehavna, including a 120-meter tunnel. Four 15 cm cannons were also installed in concrete gun pits on the sloping rocks. The four K-370 b cannons had a target range of 15,000 meters. The fort’s first commander was Hauptmann Klenner and the fort’s purpose was to protect the coastal entry to Sandefjord.

The fort was originally known as "Vesterøen" but was given the name Folehavna in 1943. The area was occupied by German forces in 1941 when Folehavna was owned by shipowner Anton Fredrik Klaveness. Folehavna came under the control of the Norwegian Armed Forces in May 1945, and in July 1950, 0.2 km2 (47 acres) was deemed an open-space area open for visitors. The Norwegian Armed Forces maintained control of the area until 1993. Although German forces at the fort were never in direct battles, they utilized Folehavna Fort to shoot down a British airplane in 1944. Today, Folehavna is used for recreational activities such as hiking, biking, and fishing. The parking lot is located 1.5 km (1 mi.) from the fort.

Geography

Veserøya is a peninsula with a length of 10 km, immediately south of the city center in Sandefjord. Its highest hills, Kamfjordåsene, lie on the northern part of the peninsula and has an elevation of around 100 meters above sea level. Another hill, Vardås, is a popular hiking destination. The landscape is characterized by steep hills, smooth rock slopes (svaberg), farm fields, minor bays, and a number of beaches and islets, and an extensive coastline. The bedrock that Vesterøya consists of, Larvikite, was created roughly 270 million years ago of plutonic rocks by magma.

West Island is home to numerous preserved areas, including Holtan Plant Preserve, the only place in Vestfold og Telemark where the species Pipsissewa (Chimaphila umbellata) occurs.

Beaches

Some beaches at West Island:

 Asnes
 Tangen
 Folehavna
 Sjøbakken
 Langeby
 Albertstranda
 Vøra
 Fruvika
 Grubesand
 Langestrand
 Ormestadvika

A rest area ("Thomas Numme rasteplass") at Langeby Beach is named after TV personality Thomas Numme, who grew up on Vesterøya.

See also
 Østerøya (East Island)

References

Beaches of Norway
Peninsulas of Vestfold og Telemark
Sandefjord